Alexis Krasilovsky is an American filmmaker, writer and professor. Krasilovsky's first film, End of the Art World documented artists including Andy Warhol and Robert Rauschenberg. Krasilovsky moved from New York to Los Angeles in the 1970s to pursue her passion for filmmaking, writing and directing films through her company, Rafael Film.  She is the writer and director of the global documentary features, Women Behind the Camera and Let Them Eat Cake.

Early life and education

Krasilovsky is the daughter of children's book author Phyllis Krasilovsky and entertainment attorney William Krasilovsky. She grew up in Chappaqua, New York, in a home that was previously lived in by the editor of the famous novelists Thomas Wolfe and Richard Wright, who became two of her favorite writers.  After studying at Smith College and the University of Florence in Italy, she graduated with honors from Yale University and received her MFA in Film/Video from the California Institute of the Arts.

Career 
Alexis Krasilovsky has received multiple awards and accolades that span the globe for her works as a female filmmaker.  She is the recipient of a lifetime achievement award, "The Special Award of the Festival THE GATE OF FREEDOM" from the 2011 Gdansk DocFilm Festival and the 2008 Tribute Award from the San Francisco Women's Film Festival "for achievements in independent film." Her film Women Behind the Camera won Best Documentary awards at the Female Eye Film Festival (Toronto, Canada); the Moondance Film Festival (Universal City, California); and the W.I.N. (Women's Image Network) Film Festival (Hollywood). Krasilovsky's Shooting Women won the Best International Documentary Award at the World of Women’s Cinema (WOW) Film Festival (Sydney, Australia). She won the "Best of the Fest" Literary Award at the 2008 Austin Woman's Film, Music and Literary Festival for Some Women Writers Kill Themselves (a DVD collection of several videopoems and poetry chapbooks).

Krasilovsky's work has earned the support of several other artists including Barbra Streisand who has said of Krasilovsky's documentary Exile "Such films do more than increase East-West understanding and reduce tensions; they also serve to emphasize that we are all essentially one people, which may be the best hope for our world."

Alexis Krasilovsky's documentaries often address controversial topics. Beale Street follows the last march of Martin Luther King Jr. in Memphis, Tennessee.

One of Krasilovsky's best-known films is Let Them Eat Cake, a global documentary feature contrasting the role of pastry in the world from those who overindulge, to people in Third World countries who have never consumed a pastry.  The film documents the ingredients, creation of pastry, and the effects that pastry has—including obesity and diabetes—in several countries including Bangladesh, France, India, Japan, Mexico, Peru, Somalia, Turkey and the United States. The film has screened worldwide at several festivals, and features music from artists like Jenny Eloise Rieu, Ed Finney, Yasumi Miyazawa and Minoti Vaishnav.

Krasilovsky is the author of Great Adaptations: Screenwriting and Global Storytelling (Routledge: New York/London, October 15, 2017) and co-author of Shooting Women: Behind the Camera, Around the World (Intellect Books / U. Chicago Press, 2015) with Harriet Margolis and Julia Stein.  Krasilovsky is also the author of Women Behind the Camera: Conversations with Camerawomen and several articles that have appeared in Creative Screenwriting.  She has also contributed chapters to the books The Search for Reality: The Art of Documentary Filmmaking (ed. Michael Tobias, Michael Wiese Productions, 1998) and Women and Poetry: Tips on Writing, Teaching and Publishing by Successful Women Poets (ed. Carol Smallwood, McFarland, January 2012).

Krasilovsky is a member of the Writers Guild of America West.  She is also a member of the Association of Women Directors, the International Documentary Association and Women in Film.

Personal life 
Alexis Krasilovsky lives in Los Angeles and is an Emeritus Professor in the Department of Cinema and Television Arts at California State University, Northridge, where she taught screenwriting and film studies.

Filmography 

 Let Them Eat Cake (2014 - Distributed through Amazon Video Direct and Rafael Film) - writer, producer and director

 Shooting Women (2008 – Distributed in North American through Women Make Movies and internationally through Cinephil) – writer, producer and director

 Some Women Writers Kill Themselves:  Selected Videopoems & Poetry of Alexis Krasilovsky (2008) – writer, producer and director

 Women Behind the Camera (2007 – Distributed through Amazon Video Prime, Cinephil and Rafael Film) – writer, producer and director

 Epicenter U. (1995) - Krasilovsky, a California State University, Northridge Film Department professor, affected by the 1994 Northridge earthquake, responded with two films – writer, producer and director

 Earthquake Haggadah, narrated by Wanda Coleman, (1995), soundtrack aired on WBAI's "Arts Express" (New York) on 3 June 2015 - writer, producer and director 

 What Memphis Needs (1991 – Distributed through Canyon Cinema Coop in 16mm and DVD and as part of the DVD, "Some Women Writers Kill Themselves") - writer, producer and director

 Exile (1984) – writer, producer and director

 Just Between Me and God (1982 – Available on 16mm through Canyon Cinema and as part of the DVD "Mr. Boogie Woogie")  – writer, producer and director

 Beale Street  (1978, 1981) – co-directed by Alexis Krasilovsky, Ann Rickey and Walter Baldwin

 Mr. Boogie Woogie (1978) – director

 Blood (1975) – writer, producer and director

 End of the Art World  (1971 - Distributed through Amazon Video Prime) – writer, producer and director

Awards 

 "Best Documentary Feature" Award - Paris Independent Film Festival, Paris, France, 2015.

 "Special Festival Award ‘THE GATE OF FREEDOM’" – Gdansk DocFilm Festival, Gdansk, Poland, 2011.

 "Best International Documentary" – WOW [Women of the World] Film Festival, Sydney, Australia, for Shooting Women, 2008 ;

 Tribute Award, San Francisco Women's Film Festival, 2008;

 "Best Women in Cinema Award", San Francisco Women's Film Festival, 2008;

 "Best of Fest" Literary Award, Austin Woman's Music, Film & Literary Festival, for Some Women Writers Kill Themselves: Selected Videopoems & Poetry of Alexis Krasilovsky, 2008;

 "Best of Fest – Documentary Film," Women's Image Network (WIN) Awards, American Film Institute, for Women Behind the Camera, 2009;

 "Best Documentary Feature" Award, Female Eye Film Festival (Toronto, Canada), for Women Behind the Camera, 2008;

 "Best Long Form Documentary," BEA (Broadcast Educators’ Association) Media Festival (Las Vegas, Nevada), for Women Behind the Camera, 2008;

 Accolade Competition Award of Excellence: Contemporary Issues/Awareness-Raising, for Women Behind the Camera, 2007;

 Insight Award for Excellence: Documentary Editing, for Women Behind the Camera, 2007;

 2007 Spirit of Moondance Award for Best Documentary Feature (Hollywood), for Women Behind the Camera.

Books 

Great Adaptations: Screenwriting and Global Storytelling Routledge: New York, London, October 2017.

Shooting Women: Behind the Camera, Around the World (co-author with Harriet Margolis and Julia Stein) Intellect Books / U. Chicago Press, 2015.

Women Behind the Camera: Conversations with Camerawomen
Praeger: Westport, Connecticut, 1997. Published by www.greenwood.com.

Some Women Writers Kill Themselves and Other Poems
A Street Agency Publication: Los Angeles, 1983, 1985.

References 

i.  Thomas, Kevin. "Feminist Films at the Vanguard," Los Angeles Times, 24 February 1976, p. 9.  "With ferocious wit, Ms. Krasilovsky sends up New York’s art scene in ‘End of the Art World’ (1971).  In essence, Ms. Krasilovsky uses the sounds and images of the usual art documentary to create her own work of art.  In the process—or reprocess—she satirizes the fatuity of the standard interview with the artist and by the end identifies art with revolution as she fantasizes the quite literal obliteration of the Metropolitan Museums’ 20th-century art curator, Henry Geldzahler."

ii.  Sanchez, Sergio.  "Cal State Northridge Professor Wins ‘The Gate of Freedom’ Award at Festival.  https://web.archive.org/web/20110605192231/http://blogs.csun.edu/news/2011/05/gate-of-freedom/.  24 May 2011.  Accessed 26 November 2011.

iii.  "WIF Member Alexis Krasilovsky Wins Best International Documentary Award"  1 Nov 2008.  http://wif.org/index.php?option=com_content&view=article&id=390:kRASILOVSKY%20WINS.  Accessed 25 November 2011.

iv.  Abir, Rahad, "Book Review: Women Behind the Camera" (in Bangla), Daily Destiny, Dhaka, Bangladesh, 2 January 2009.  Accessed 25 November 2011.

v.  Thomas, G. Murray, "Reviews: ‘The Earthquake Haggadah’; ‘What Memphis Needs,’" Next: Guide to So Cal Poets, Vol.2 No.8, Oct. 1995, p.18.

vi.  Walston, Joan. "’Exile’: A Jewish Filmmaker’s Journey of Self-Discovery," The Jewish Journal. 3–9 Oct. 1986, pp.17,21.  "Watching it, we can realize how at times we have felt both blessed and cursed by the fate that caused our parents and grandparents to leave their homelands and settle in America, the fate which enables most of us to be alive today." p. 21.

vii.  Elrod, Nickii.  "Riverside Finds Filmmaker Advocate," The Commercial Appeal, Memphis, 16 Dec 1977, p. 26.  "The heavies of the film will be chemical plant smokestacks, beer cans and the dump fires that send animals, and often the residents, scurrying for safety." p. 26

viii.  Hortig, Michael.  "New DVD Mose Vinson,"  http://weeniecampbell.com/yabbse/index.php?topic=5670.msg45800#msg45800, 28 May 2009.  Accessed 26 November 2011.  "…a new DVD about the life of barrelhouse pianist Mose Vinson from Memphis, filmed in the late 70s when Vinson was at his peak..."

ix.  Thomas, Kevin. op.cit., p. 9.  "In its stream-of-consciousness way ‘Blood’ (1975), evokes Manhattan street life even more powerfully than Martin Scorsese’s ‘Taxi Driver’ (to be released Wednesday at selected theaters).

Sources 

	Fisher,  Bob. Distaff DPs: Krasilovsky Chronicles 'Women Behind the Camera', Documentary, Spring 2008.  www.documentary.org/content/distaff-dps.  Accessed 27 November 2011.

	Kamol, Ershad. "10th Dhaka International Film Festival – Alexis Krasilovosky: ‘Woman Behind the Screen’ meets the press," The Daily Star, Dhaka, Bangladesh, 15 January 2008. http://www.thedailystar.net/story.php?nid=19235.  Accessed 27 November 2011.

	King, Kathleen J., "Interview with Alexis Krasilovsky, Director of "Women Behind the Camera," Divine Caroline, April 2008, http://editorial.www.divinecaroline.com/30378/47279-interview-alexis-krasilovsky-director-camera/3.  Accessed 27 November 2011.

	Shedde, Meenakshi.  "Women don’t only bear kids, they bear witness," Sunday Times of India, Mumbai, 28 December 2003 p. 4.

	Williams, David E., "Another View: Alexis Krasilovsky's 'WOMEN BEHIND THE CAMERA' Sheds Light on a Diverse Array of Female Directors of Photography", DV Magazine, January 2008, www.dv.com.  Accessed 27 November 2011.

External links 
 
 Alexis Krasilovsky’s website
 Alexis Krasilovsky at Canyon Cinema
 Women Make Movies
 Alexis Krasilovsky at California Institute of the Arts

1950 births
Living people
American filmmakers
Yale University alumni
University of Florence alumni
California State University, Northridge faculty
California College of the Arts alumni
Screenwriting instructors
People from Chappaqua, New York